St. Luke AME Church is a historic African Methodist Episcopal church at 2803 21st Avenue North in Birmingham, Alabama.  It was designed by the pioneering African American Architect Wallace Rayfield. It was built in 1926 and added to the National Register of Historic Places in 2005.  The church was significant in the civil rights movement.

See also
St. Luke AME Zion Church - also in Birmingham, also significant in the civil rights movement, and also added to the NRHP in 2005

References

African-American history in Birmingham, Alabama
Churches on the National Register of Historic Places in Alabama
National Register of Historic Places in Birmingham, Alabama
Gothic Revival church buildings in Alabama
Churches completed in 1926
Churches in Birmingham, Alabama
African Methodist Episcopal churches in Alabama
1926 establishments in Alabama